Ng Wai is a former Chinese actress from Hong Kong.

Filmography

Films 
This is a partial list of films.
 1953 Yu nu qing chou
 1954 Gui lai Landlady
 1964 Lovers' Rock as Hui Tan
 1965 Xiao yun que 
 1965 Songfest as Madam Li
 1965 Huo shao hong lian si zhi yuan yang jian xia
 1966 Wen Suchen as Tso Shi
 1966 Princess Iron Fan as Mother Cicada Fiary
 1967 Fei tian nu lang
 1967 Nu xun an
 1967 Dai lu nian hua as Mao a-mah
 1967 The Dragon Creek
 1967 Hong Kong Nocturne
 1967 The Cave of the Silken Web
 1967 Ru xia
 1967 Shan Shan 
 1968 Hong Kong Rhapsody - credited as Ng Wai. 
 1968 Hua yue liang xiao
 1968 Guai xia
 1968 Duan hun gu 
 1968 Hu xia 
 1968 Divorce, Hong Kong Style 
 1969 Bi hai qing tian ye ye xin 
 1969 The Golden Sword 
 1970 Yi chi chun shui 
 1970 Shuang xi ling men 
 1970 Er nu shi wo men de 
 1970 A Time for Love 
 1970 Ai qing de dai jia as Madam buyer
 1970 Tie luo han 
 1971 The Silent Love 
 1972 The Human Goddess 
 1972 Duo xie lao ban niang 
 1972 Wa wa fu ren 
 1972 Fists of Vengeance as Brothel madam
 1972 Shao nai nai de si wa 
 1972 Wang ming tu 
 1973 Bei di yan zhi 
 1974 The Chinese Tiger 
 1974 The Suicide Murder 
 1974 E hu cun 
 1974 Naughty! Naughty! 
 1975 Xiao Shandong dao Xianggang 
 1976 Lian ai gong fu

References

External links
 
 Ng Wai at hkcinemagic.com

Hong Kong film actresses
Living people
20th-century Hong Kong actresses
Year of birth missing (living people)
Place of birth missing (living people)